103.1 Brigada News FM (DWKM 103.1 MHz) is an FM station owned by Century Broadcasting Network and operated by Brigada Mass Media Corporation. Its studios and transmitter are located at 3rd Floor ANR Bldg. 1, Maharlika Highway, Brgy. Concepcion Grande, Naga, Camarines Sur.

History
January 5, 2011 - DWKM first went on air as KMFM under Bicol Media Network Group.
October 5, 2013 - KMFM moved to 100.7 FM of Sorsogon Broadcasting Corporation, leaving the frequency off the air.
April 2016 - Brigada Mass Media Corporation leased the station and launched it as Brigada News FM.
May 28, 2021 - KMFM 100.7 went off air after former Camarines Sur Congressman Rolando Andaya Jr. complained to the NTC that DWKM was still operating despite the expiration of Sorsogon Broadcasting Corporation's franchise in November 2020.

References

External links
Brigada News FM Naga FB Page
Brigada News FM Naga Website

Radio stations in Naga, Camarines Sur
Radio stations established in 2011